Play 'n' the Game is the eighth studio album by the Scottish hard rock band Nazareth, released in 1976.

Track listing

30th Anniversary Bonus Tracks 2006

Personnel

Band members
Dan McCafferty - vocals
Manny Charlton - guitar
Pete Agnew - bass guitar, guitar, background vocals
Darrell Sweet - drums, percussion, background vocals

Other credits
Nick Blagona - engineer
Bob Ludwig - mastering
Mike Brown - remastering
Robert M. Corich - liner notes, remastering
Laura Vallis - design

Chart performance

Certifications

References

External links
Lyrics to songs from Play 'N' the Game

Nazareth (band) albums
1976 albums
A&M Records albums